"Matte Kudasai" literally "Wait, Please" in Japanese, is a ballad by the progressive rock band King Crimson. Featuring vocals by Adrian Belew, it was released as the first single from the album Discipline (1981). In the UK, the single just missed the chart. 

"Matte Kudasai" evolved out of a guitar riff played by Robert Fripp during 1980 tour rehearsals for Fripp's short-lived new wave band The League of Gentlemen. That riff, in turn, had similarities to Fripp's song "North Star", which had appeared on his 1979 album Exposure (with vocals, and lyrics, by Daryl Hall). The League of Gentlemen practiced playing along with Fripp; the rehearsal recording was later posted online by Discipline Global Mobile archivist Alex R. "Stormy" Mundy, who dubbed the resulting song "Northa Kudasai" to reflect its intermediate state.

For the 1989 Definitive Edition remaster of Discipline, the song was remixed to remove the Frippertronics parts that dotted the original 1981 version. The 30th and 35th anniversary editions, meanwhile, contain both mixes of the song: the 1989 version is kept as track three, while the 1981 version (billed as an "Alternative Version") is featured at the end of the album as a bonus track.

Adrian Belew applies a slide and echo to his guitar to simulate the sound of seagulls twice in the song; once at the beginning, and again near the end.

Personnel
Robert Fripp – Roland G-303 guitar synthesizer controller, Roland GR-300 guitar synthesizer
Adrian Belew – guitar, vocals
Tony Levin – Music Man Stingray 4 bass
Bill Bruford – drums

Covers
The short-lived jazz group Crimson Jazz Trio, founded by former King Crimson drummer Ian Wallace to play instrumental jazz versions of King Crimson songs, included "Matte Kudasai" on their first album, The King Crimson Songbook, Volume One (2005).

Jazz singer Kurt Elling covered the song as the opening track of his 2011 album The Gate.

On 20 April 2011, k.d. lang and her band the Siss Boom Bang covered the song as part of her concert at the BBC Radio Theater. The audio and video of that performance were broadcast on 21 April 2011 on BBC Radio 2. Lang noted in her introduction to the song that it was influential on the sound of her fifth album, Ingenue.

The Levin Brothers (keyboardist/arranger Pete Levin and King Crimson bassist Tony Levin) included an instrumental version of "Matte Kudasai" on their 2014 album Levin Brothers.

References

King Crimson songs
1981 songs
1981 singles
1980s ballads
Songs written by Adrian Belew
Songs written by Robert Fripp
Songs written by Bill Bruford
Songs written by Tony Levin
Warner Records singles
Rock ballads